Isabelo Rivera Negrón (born 1956) was the 21st Puerto Rico Adjutant General, and the commanding officer of the Puerto Rico National Guard.

Early years and education
Isabelo Rivera was born in Las Piedras, Puerto Rico. Has a BA in economics from the University of Puerto Rico, Río Piedras Campus, MBA in Management from the Metropolitan University of Puerto Rico and a juris doctor from the Interamerican University of Puerto Rico School of Law. Also attended the Inter-American Defense College at Fort Lesley J. McNair and the United States Army Command and General Staff College. Resident Senior Service College Dual Status Commanders Course (NORTHCOM) and the Joint Task Force Commanders Course.

National Guard career
Commissioned as a 2nd lieutenant thru the ROTC program on June 7, 1976 in the Puerto Rico National Guard. His first assignment was as an Assistant Finance Officer, Alpha Company, 192d Support Battalion, Puerto Rico Army National Guard in San Juan, Puerto Rico. Certified Defense Financial Manager (CDFM) American Association of Military Comptrollers. Was appointed Adjutant General for the Puerto Rico National Guard on January 17, 2017, by Puerto Rico Governor Ricardo Rosselló. During his tenure as Adjutant General of the Puerto Rico National Guard, Rivera led the PRNG during the recovery relief efforts after the path of Hurricane Maria thru Puerto Rico. Isabelo Rivera resigned the position as Puerto Rico Adjutant General to retire after 42 years of military service.

July 1976 – June 1977: Assistant Finance Officer, Alpha Company, 192nd Support Battalion, Puerto Rico Army National Guard, San Juan, Puerto Rico
July 1977 – September 1977: Finance Officer Basic Course, United States of America Institute of Administration, Fort Benjamin Harrison, Indiana
December 1977 – November 1977: Assistant Finance Officer, Alpha Company, 192nd Support Battalion, Puerto Rico Army National Guard, San Juan, Puerto Rico
December 1979 – November 1982: Military Pay Officer, 192nd Support Battalion, Puerto Rico Army National Guard, San Juan, Puerto Rico
December 1982 – March 1985: Deputy Finance Officers, Joint Forces Headquarters, Puerto Rico Army National Guard, San Juan, Puerto Rico
August 1985 – November 1986: Company Commander, A Company, 192nd Support Battalion, Puerto Rico Army National Guard, San Juan, Puerto Rico
November 1986 – October 1987: Finance Officer, 192nd Support Battalion, Puerto Rico Army National Guard, San Juan, Puerto Rico
October 1987 – July 1988: Budget Officer, Joint Forces Headquarters, Puerto Rico Army National Guard, San Juan, Puerto Rico
July 1988 – November 1988: Student, Finance Officer Advanced Course, Finance School Fort Benjamin Harrison, Indiana.
November 1988 – August 1994: Comptroller, Headquarters State Area Command, Puerto Rico Army National Guard, San Juan, Puerto Rico
August 1994 – May 1997: Logistic Division Chief, Headquarters State Area Command, Puerto Rico Army National Guard, San Juan, Puerto Rico
June 1997 – October 1998: Battalion Commander, 292nd Corps Support Battalion, Rico Army National Guard, San Juan, Puerto Rico
August 1998 – June 2000: Comptroller, Joint Forces Headquarters, Puerto Rico Army National Guard, San Juan, Puerto Rico
July 2000 – June 2001: Student, Inter American Defense College, Fort Lesley J. McNair, Washington, District of Columbia
July 2001 – September 2001: Comptroller, Joint Forces Headquarters, Puerto Rico Army National Guard, San Juan, Puerto Rico
September 2001 – September 2002: Chief, Post Mobilization State, Joint Forces Headquarters, Puerto Rico Army National Guard, San Juan, Puerto Rico
October 2002 – July 2005: Director Fiscal and Property, Joint Forces Headquarters, Puerto Rico Army National Guard, San Juan, Puerto Rico
July 2005 – January 2007: Deputy Chief of Staff of Logistic, Joint Forces Headquarters, Puerto Rico Army National Guard, San Juan, Puerto Rico
January 2007 – March 2008: Chief, Joint Staff, Joint Forces Headquarters, Puerto Rico Army National Guard, San Juan, Puerto Rico
April 2008 – June 2013: United States Property and Fiscal for Puerto Rico, US Army Field Element National Guard Bureau, Arlington, Virginia
June 2013 – November 2014: Assistant Adjutant General, Joint Forces Headquarters, San Juan, Puerto Rico
November 2014 – January 2017: Commander, Land Component Command, Puerto Rico
January 2017 – February 2019: The Adjutant General, Puerto Rico, San Juan, Puerto Rico

Military awards and decorations

Effective dates of promotions

See also
List of Puerto Rican military personnel
Puerto Rico Adjutant General

References
http://www.nationalguard.mil/portals/31/Features/ngbgomo/bio/2/2115.html

External links
 

1956 births
Interamerican University of Puerto Rico alumni
Living people
United States Army generals
National Guard (United States) generals
People from Las Piedras, Puerto Rico
Puerto Rican military officers
Puerto Rico Adjutant Generals
Recipients of the Defense Superior Service Medal
Recipients of the Humanitarian Service Medal
Recipients of the Meritorious Service Medal (United States)
University of Puerto Rico alumni
United States Army Command and General Staff College alumni
Puerto Rico National Guard personnel